The men's 470 competition at the 2010 Asian Games in Shanwei was held from 14 to 20 November 2010.

Schedule
All times are China Standard Time (UTC+08:00)

Results

References

External links
 

Men's 470